Herwig Baier (born May 21, 1965, in Münster) is a German neurobiologist with dual German and US-American citizenship. He is Director at the Max Planck Institute for Biological Intelligence (formerly Max Planck Institute of Neurobiology) and head of the department Genes – Circuits – Behavior. Herwig Baier's research aims to understand how animal brains convert sensory inputs into behavioral responses.

Herwig Baier studied biology at the University of Konstanz. In 1990, he joined Friedrich Bonhoeffer's laboratory at the Max Planck Institute for Developmental Biology in Tübingen, where he obtained his diploma (1990) and PhD degree (1995). For his post-doctoral training, he moved to the University of California, San Diego, to work with William (Bill) Harris. In 1997, Baier was offered a faculty position by the University of California, San Francisco, where he remained as Full Professor until 2012. In 2011, the Max Planck Society recruited him as Director at the Max Planck Institute of Neurobiology in Martinsried (Germany).

Scientific focus
The overarching theme of Baier's scientific contributions to neuroscience has been the elucidation of molecular, cellular, synaptic and circuit mechanisms of nervous system function and animal behavior. The following questions are of particular interest:
 What are the specific functions of neuronal cell types in perception and behavior?
 How is circuit organization and composition related to behavioral function? 
 How are neural circuits modulated and integrated into wider networks to orchestrate complex, flexible behavior? 
 How do neurons become different during development? How are their processes guided to their targets, and how do they form specific synaptic connections?
Herwig Baier's work led to a number of scientific discoveries:
 Establishing zebrafish for neuroscience: Since the early 1990s, Baier pioneered the use of zebrafish (Danio rerio), as an experimental model for neuroscience and behavioral genetics, taking advantage of the optical transparency of these animals at larval stages and their genetic modifiability. This work led to the first large-scale behavioral screens in search of genes that wire the visual system for behavior. (Baier et al., Development 1996; Neuhauss et al., Journal of Neuroscience 1999; Muto et al., PLOS Genetics 2005)
 Molecular and cellular mechanisms underlying the formation of retinotopic and visual feature maps: Baier contributed to the identification of gradient-based axon guidance mechanisms during development of the visual system. His group also discovered the role of Slit-Robo signaling in the precise targeting of layers in the optic tectum by ingrowing retinal axons. (Baier and Bonhoeffer, Science 1992; Gosse et al., Nature 2008; Xiao et al., Cell 2011)
 Cell fate decisions in the developing visual system: Baier discovered the role of interkinetic nuclear migration in apportioning cell fates in the retina. (Del Bene et al., Cell 2008)
 Remote optical control of behavior: Baier's group was the first to use optogenetic techniques for circuit analysis in zebrafish. By targeting the expression of fluorescent indicators and optogenetic effectors, such as Channelrhodopsin (ChR2), Halorhodopsin (NpHR) or the light-activated glutamate receptor (LiGluR), to specific brain areas and shining light at single neurons, he and his collaborators showed that an animal's behavior can be reversibly and specifically altered on millisecond timescales. (Szobota et al., Neuron 2007; Arrenberg et al., Proc. Natl. Acad. Sci. USA 2009; Wyart et al., Nature 2009)
 Two-photon optogenetics with 3D resolution in the intact brain of a behaving animal: In 2017, Baier's team introduced an optical technique that enables precise remote control of neural activity, called two-photon holographic optogenetics. By inserting a spatial light modulator into the optical path of a two-photon microscope, the technique allows to photostimulate an arbitrary population of single neurons in the zebrafish brain while observing the resulting behavior. This method is instrumental for the functional annotation of neural circuits. (Dal Maschio et al., Neuron 2017)

Recognition
Baier received the Otto Hahn Medal of the Max Planck Society (1995) for his PhD work and a Feodor Lynen Fellowship of the Alexander von Humboldt Foundation (1995). As a faculty member at UCSF, he received the David and Lucile Packard Fellowship in Science and Engineering (1999), the Sloan Fellowship in Neuroscience (2000), the Klingenstein Award (2001) and the Byers Award for Basic Science Research (2006). He is an Honorary Professor of the Ludwig Maximilian University of Munich, and a member of the  European Molecular Biology Organization (EMBO).

Industry activities
In 2001, Herwig Baier co-founded, with Bill Harris and Paul Goldsmith, Daniolabs Ltd (Cambridge, UK), a biotech company with a focus on zebrafish drug screening for the discovery new treatments of ophthalmic, neurological and gastrointestinal diseases.

Baier serves as a scientific consultant to biotech companies.

References

External links
 Homepage of the department Genes – Circuits – Behavior

21st-century German biologists
1965 births
Living people
University of California, San Francisco faculty
Max Planck Institute directors
University of Konstanz alumni
University of Tübingen alumni
German neuroscientists
People from Münster